The Telstra NRL Women's Premiership (NRLW) is Australia's national rugby league competition for female players. The first season of the league began in September 2018 with four teams. The league is run by the National Rugby League (NRL) and is contested by a subset of clubs from that competition. The current premiers are the Newcastle Knights.

History

In 2016, the Cronulla-Sutherland Sharks and St. George Illawarra Dragons contested a Women's Nine's match, which served as a curtain-raiser to the NRL match between the Sharks and Sydney Roosters, at Southern Cross Group Stadium. The Sharks won the match 16–12.

In March 2017, the Cronulla-Sutherland Sharks played another Women's Nine's match, this time defeating the Canberra Raiders by 28–10.

2017 – 2020: Establishment
On 6 December 2017, shortly after the conclusion of the 2017 Women's Rugby League World Cup, which concluded with the Jillaroos defeating the New Zealand Ferns by 23–16 in the final, it was announced by the National Rugby League that the inaugural NRL Women's season would operate in a round-robin format, and be held in August 2018, towards the back end of the men's season, with some matches to be played as curtain-raisers to NRL finals matches. The Grand Final, which will be contested between the top two teams at the end of the round robin stage, will be played on the same day as the men's Grand Final. It was also announced that a stand-alone State of Origin match would also be contested in the representative weekend, in June.

The Newcastle Knights, St. George Illawarra Dragons, Brisbane Broncos, New Zealand Warriors, Sydney Roosters, South Sydney Rabbitohs and Cronulla-Sutherland Sharks all declared their interest in applying for a licence to participate in the inaugural NRL Women's competition. Other clubs, such as the Melbourne Storm, Manly Warringah Sea Eagles, Gold Coast Titans, North Queensland Cowboys, Canberra Raiders, Wests Tigers, Parramatta Eels, Penrith Panthers and Canterbury-Bankstown Bulldogs, all decided to delay bidding until at least the next season, citing money and time constraints.

On 27 March 2018, the National Rugby League announced that the Brisbane Broncos, New Zealand Warriors, St. George Illawarra Dragons and Sydney Roosters had won bids to participate in the inaugural NRL Women's competition, to commence in September 2018.

2021 – present: Competition expansion
In June 2021 the NRL announced that the NRLW competition would commence expansion and increase to six teams. Initially this meant adding an additional two teams to the competition; however, the New Zealand Warriors announced that they were withdrawing from the competition due to difficulties of moving through borders during the COVID pandemic and an exodus of players and officials. This created an additional spot in the competition, with the NRL announcing that the Gold Coast Titans, Newcastle Knights and Parramatta Eels would be joining the competition for the 2021 season to keep numbers at six.

In March 2022, the National Rugby League and Australian Rugby League Commission announced that NRLW competition will further expand over the course of the 2023 and 2024 seasons by adding two clubs in each season.
Clubs were invited to make submissions to join the league and were required to by April 2022, six were received. The Six clubs that made submissions for an NRLW licence in the expanded competition were: Canberra Raiders, Cronulla Sharks, North Queensland Cowboys, South Sydney Rabbitohs, Penrith Panthers and Wests Tigers. The New Zealand Warriors had previously indicated their desire to return a team to the NRLW competition however, they did not place a submission at this time.

In June 2022, the NRL changed their stance and decided to bring all expansion sides in together with the announcement that the four teams would all be admitted in the 2023 season, and that those four clubs were to be: Canberra, Cronulla, North Queensland and Wests Tigers. The 2023 NRLW season will run for 11 weeks (9 rounds, Semi-Finals and a Grand Final).

Following the announcement both the South Sydney Rabbitohs and Penrith Panthers released statements congratulating the clubs that had been chosen, and that they both would be interested in joining the competition in future seasons.

Clubs
NRL Women's operates on a single table system, with no divisions, conferences nor promotion and relegation from other leagues.

The competition's 6 teams are based across 2 states of Australia.

Current clubs

Future clubs

Club in recess

Players

The club's playing lists were constructed from scratch through the later stages of 2018. All participants in the 2018 season were required to be over the age of 17.

Initially, clubs were asked to nominate a list of desired players, with the NRL assigning two of these "marquee" players to each club. In addition, clubs were able to sign a number of players with existing connections to the club, or with arrangements for club sponsored work or study.

Salary

NRL Women's Premiership hands contracts to 40 elite women players.

The top level salary is $60,000 (excluding marquee deals). Representative Origin payments are $6,000 per game.

Season structure

Pre-season
Prior to the commencement of the home-and-away season teams are paired off to play an exhibition trial match.

Premiership season

The season operates using a Round-robin format, with the top two finishing teams to contest the Grand Final which is to be held on the same day as the men's NRL Grand Final. The draw is structured around the men's finals series.

The rules and regulations are mostly the same as in the men's game, with a few exceptions:
 original matches were sixty minutes long, with thirty minutes in each half. 2022 season revised to seventy minute matches, consisting of thirty-five minutes per half.
 ten interchanges in each match, with an additional two during golden point; and
 a 40/30 kick advantage providing for tactical kicking and unpredictability during matches.

Postseason
In October 2018, NRL announced the inaugural edition of Rugby League World Cup 9s in Western Sydney on 18–19 October 2019, featuring 12 international men's teams and 4 women's teams. This would be around one month after the Women's Grand Final and preseason tournament Auckland Nines in previous years was replaced.

Seasons

* The 2021 season was postponed due to the COVID-19 pandemic; the season started on 27 February 2022 and was completed on 10 April.

Grand Finals

Awards
The following major individual awards and accolades are presented each season:

Best & Fairest Trophy – to the best and fairest player in the league, voted by the referees
Leading Try Award – to the player who scores the most tries during the home-and-away season
Rookie of the Year – 
Veronica White Medal –
Karyn Murphy Medal – the best player on the ground in the Grand Final, voted by a committee of media members

Records

Most Individual Points 
Table last updated 3 October 2022 (after the Grand Final of the 2022 Season).

Premierships

Most consecutive
3 -  Brisbane Broncos (2018 to 2020)

Runners-Up

Minor Premierships

Most consecutive
4 -  Brisbane Broncos (2018 to 2021)

Matches played 

Last updated: 3 October 2022

Media coverage

Television
In its inaugural season all matches will be televised live by affiliate partners the Nine Network and Fox League.
And NRLWRAP

Online
The official internet/mobile broadcast partner of the NRL is 9Now and Kayo Sports.

Outside Australia, the inaugural season is available on Watch NRL.

Corporate relations

Sponsorship
Holden is the league's past and inaugural naming rights partner.

Telstra is the league's naming rights partner.

All playing and training equipment as well as all licensed apparel and hats for the league's four clubs are manufactured by Nike.

Other league sponsors include Rebel Sport, Harvey Norman and Kellogg's.

The official ball supplier is Steeden.

Merchandising
Official match day attire together with other club merchandise is sold through the NRL's stores and website as well through the clubs and through some retailers.

See also

 List of sports awards honoring women
Australia women's national rugby league team
Women's rugby league in Australia
Australian Women's Rugby League
National Rugby League
Women's Super League
NZRL Women's National Tournament

References

External links

Dragons Lair - NRLW Fan Discussion Forum

 
National Rugby League
2018 establishments in Australia
Sports leagues established in 2018
Women's rugby league competitions in Australia
Professional sports leagues in Australia
Professional sports leagues in New Zealand